Gamelin was a federal electoral district in Quebec, Canada, that was represented in the House of Commons of Canada from 1968 to 1988. This riding was created in 1966 from parts of Maisonneuve—Rosemont and Mercier ridings. It was abolished in 1987 when it was redistributed into Anjou—Rivière-des-Prairies, Hochelaga—Maisonneuve, Mercier and Saint-Léonard ridings.

Members of Parliament

This riding elected the following Members of Parliament:

Election results

 
|Démocratisation Économique
|Emile Laporte||align=right|  365

See also 

 List of Canadian federal electoral districts
 Past Canadian electoral districts

External links
Riding history from the Library of Parliament

Former federal electoral districts of Quebec